The second season of the Japanese animated television series A Certain Magical Index, based on the light novel of the same name, follows the adventures of Toma Kamijo and Index as they face the threat of the Roman Catholic Church. It was produced by J.C.Staff, with Hiroshi Nishikiori and Masanao Akahoshi serving as director and series composition writer, respectively.

Atsushi Abe and Yuka Iguchi reprise their respective roles as the lead characters Kamijo and Index. The returning cast also includes Rina Satō, Shizuka Itō, Kishō Taniyama, Anri Katsu, Kimiko Koyama, Satomi Arai, and Nobuhiko Okamoto. A Certain Magical Index II was confirmed in June 2010 and adapts the seventh to the thirteenth volume of the light novel.

The second season aired in Japan from October 8, 2010, to April 1, 2011, and consists of 24 episodes. A sequel was announced in October 2017.


Episode list

Cast and characters

Main

Recurring

Production

Development and writing
The production for A Certain Magical Index II was greenlit in June 2010.<ref name="2ndSeasonConfirmed">{{cite news |last=Loo |first=Egan |date=June 7, 2010 |title=Toaru Majutsu no Index'''s 2nd Season Green-Lit |url=https://www.animenewsnetwork.com/news/2010-06-07/toaru-majutsu-no-index-2nd-season-green-lit |work=Anime News Network |access-date=July 15, 2021 |url-status=live |archive-url=https://web.archive.org/web/20210715044629/https://www.animenewsnetwork.com/news/2010-06-07/toaru-majutsu-no-index-2nd-season-green-lit |archive-date=July 15, 2021}}</ref> J.C.Staff returned to produce the series, while Hiroshi Nishikiori, Masanao Akahoshi, and Yuichi Tanaka reunited from the previous season to serve as the director, series composition writer, and character animation designer, respectively. The second season adapted the seventh to the thirteenth volume of A Certain Magical Index light novel series. Yuka Iguchi revealed that Nishikiori instructed her to act "like a big shot with no proof" during recording. Rina Satō also revealed that the staff told her about Mikoto Misaka, her character, falling in love with Toma Kamijo in the second season but felt that their current rivalry was the "best way to go". Kishō Taniyama enjoyed Stiyl Magnus' teasing and tsundere-like nature, and noted that his character was "unbearable". Nozomi Sasaki revealed how she was told to bring out Misaka 10032's "individual differences" among the Misaka clones for the second season, which she found difficult to do since she eliminated it in the first season.

Casting
In June 2010, Atsushi Abe, Iguchi, and Satō were set to reprise their respective roles as Kamijo, Index, and Misaka. Shizuka Itō, Taniyama, Anri Katsu, Kimiko Koyama, and Nobuhiko Okamoto also reprise their respective roles as Kaori Kanzaki, Magnus, Motoharu Tsuchimikado, Komoe Tsukoyomi, and Accelerator. In September 2010, four new characters belonging to the Roman Catholic Church would be introduced in the series. They are Orsola Aquinas, voiced by Aya Endō, Agnese Sanctis, voiced by Rie Kugimiya, Lucia, voiced by Mariya Ise, and Angelene, voiced by Azusa Enoki.

In July 2014, Funimation announced the English dub cast for the new characters that appeared in the series. These include Mallorie Rodak as Aquinas, Alex Moore as Sanctis, Lauren Landa as Lucia, Kristin Sutton as Angelene, Duncan Brannan as Saiji Tatemiya, Bryn Apprill as Awaki Musujime, Jennifer Green as Oriana Thomson, Rachel Robinson as Lidvia Lorenzetti, and Skyler McIntosh as Seiri Fukiyose. By the following month, Kara Edwards and Marcus Stimac joined the cast as Vento of the Front and Amata Kihara, respectively.

Music
Maiko Iuchi of I've Sound returned to compose the second season, after previously doing so for A Certain Magical Index (2008). The opening theme music that aired from episodes 1 to 16 is "No Buts!" by Mami Kawada and was released on November 3, 2010. The first ending theme music that aired from episodes 1 to 13 is "Magic∞world" by Maon Kurosaki and was released on November 24, 2010. The second opening theme music that aired from episodes 17 onwards is "See Visions" by Kawada and was released on February 16, 2011.

Marketing
In September 2010, a 15-second commercial video and two collaborative commercial videos, narrated by Oreimo characters Kirino Kosaka and Kyōsuke Kosaka, for A Certain Magical Index II were released. The series also held collaboration with Maid Sama! In the same month, the edited version of the series' first episode ("August 31st") was screened at Dengeki Bungko Autumn Festival 2010. Abe, Iguchi, Satō, Itō, Taniyama, and producer Nobuhiro Nakayama were also present at the event to promote the series.

Release
BroadcastA Certain Magical Index II began airing in Japan on AT-X and Tokyo MX on October 8, 2010, on Teletama, Chiba TV, MBS, and tvk on October 9, and on CBC on October 13. The broadcast of episodes 22 and 23 on CBC and MBS were delayed due to the impact of the 2011 Tōhoku earthquake and tsunami.

Home media

Geneon Universal Entertainment released eight Blu-ray and DVD volumes of A Certain Magical Index II in Japan starting January 26, 2011. Each volume contains a bonus novel written by Kazuma Kamachi titled A Certain Scientific Railgun SS2: Ability Demonstration Trip. In October 2010, an episode of the bonus anime A Certain Magical Index-tan was announced to be included in the pre-orders of the first volume's limited edition. Funimation released the first Blu-ray and DVD combo set containing the first twelve episodes of the season in North America on October 28, 2014, which was intended to be shipped on October 14 but was delayed due to a "technical issue with the video disc replicator". The second combo set containing the remaining episodes was released on December 16, 2014, while another combo set containing the whole season was released on July 19, 2016. Manga Entertainment released the series' Blu-ray and DVD combo set in the United Kingdom on August 21, 2017.

Nico Nico Douga began streaming the series in Japan on October 14, 2010, after it aired first on television networks. Funimation began streaming the series in North America on January 14, 2014, while Crunchyroll began streaming it on December 24, 2016. Tubi added the series to its catalog for streaming in December 2017. Hulu released the series in Japan on March 24, 2022. Muse Asia began streaming the series on their official YouTube channel on June 6, 2022.

Reception
Critical response
Theron Martin of Anime News Network graded A Certain Magical Index II 'B−', considering the second season "the weakest series in the franchise". Despite the flaws of the show, such as having "horribly overwritten dialogue[s]", he praised it for advancing the "storylines on both scientific and magical fronts", its action sequences, and giving viewers "opportunities to have fun with characters both old and new". Ian Wolf of Anime UK News'' scored the series 8 out of 10, calling its action "better" than the first season, while pointing out the "violence" in the show and finding the factions' names ("Roman Orthodox Church" for Roman Catholic Church and "English Puritan Church" for Church of England) "weird".

Accolade
Okamoto won Best Supporting Actor at the 5th Seiyu Awards for his role as Accelerator.

Note

References

External links 
 

2010 anime television series debuts
A Certain Magical Index
A Certain Magical Index episode lists
J.C.Staff